The San Isabel Solar Energy Center is a 30 megawatt (MWAC) photovoltaic power station in Las Animas County, Colorado located about 20 miles north of the city of Trinidad.   The electricity is being sold to Tri-State Generation and Transmission (aka Tri-State) under a 25-year power purchase agreement.  It is the second solar project,  following the Cimarron Solar Facility in year 2010, to be added to the utility cooperative's renewables portfolio.

Project details

The facility occupies about 250 acres of semi-arid shortgrass prairie on the Colorado south-eastern plains, about 10 miles east of the base of the Rocky Mountains.  It uses 120,960 polycrystalline silicon panels (Model SN-72cell: rated 310 Wp, ~16% efficiency) that the manufacturer, S-Energy, claims are less susceptible to potential-induced degradation.  The panels are mounted in rows onto single-axis trackers to optimize electricity production throughout the day.

The project was developed, constructed, and continues to be operated by Boulder-based juwi Inc., the U.S. subsidiary of the German renewable energy company juwi AG.  Construction began in March 2016 and employed about 400 workers, with Nesco serving as contractor for the civil structures. Commercial operation began in December 2016, with a dedication ceremony on July 14, 2017.  The project was financed, and is owned by PSEG Solar Source, a subsidiary of New Jersey's Public Service Enterprise Group.  The completed facility cost about US$60 million.

On January 11, 2019 Tri-State and juwi announced their development plan for the 100 MW Spanish Peaks Solar Project, which would be sited adjacent to San Isabel Solar Energy Center.  Under their plan, juwi will continue to develop the project and Tri-State would buy the electricity under a 15-year contract.  A construction start is being targeted for year 2022, with completion in 2023.  If funded, it may be the fourth solar project, following the Alta Luna Solar Facility in 2017, to be added to Tri-State's renewables portfolio.

Electricity production

See also

 Comanche Solar Project
 Solar power in Colorado
 Solar power in the United States
 Renewable energy in the United States
 Renewable portfolio standard

References

External links
 VIDEO: San Isabel Solar - Ceremony
 VIDEO: Proposed Spanish Peaks Solar Project

Buildings and structures in Las Animas County, Colorado
Photovoltaic power stations in Colorado
Photovoltaic power stations in the United States
Energy infrastructure completed in 2016
Public Service Enterprise Group